The 2000–01 season was Villarreal Club de Fútbol's 78th season in existence and the club's first season back in the top flight of Spanish football since 1999. In addition to the domestic league, Villarreal participated in this season's edition of the Copa del Rey. The season covered the period from 1 July 2000 to 30 June 2001.

Transfers

Pre-season and friendlies

Competitions

Overall record

La Liga

League table

Results summary

Results by round

Matches

Copa del Rey

References

Villarreal CF seasons
Villarreal